The Foothill–De Anza Community College District is a community college district headquartered on the grounds of Foothill College in Los Altos Hills, California. The district operates Foothill College and De Anza College in Cupertino.

References

Universities and colleges in Santa Clara County, California
California Community Colleges